Neuronal growth regulator 1 also known as NEGR1 is a protein which in humans is encoded by the NEGR1 gene.

Clinical significance 

Variants of the NEGR1 gene may be associated with obesity and major depression.

References

Further reading

Human proteins